Sir Thomas Gower, 2nd Baronet (c. 1605–1672) was an English nobleman, politician, and knight. He was a member of the Leveson-Gower family. He twice served as High Sheriff of Yorkshire and supported the Royalist cause during the English Civil War.

Biography
Gower was knighted at Whitehall on 24 June 1630, and succeeded his father, Sir Thomas Gower, 1st Baronet, in his estate, and title of Baronet. He was a sufferer for his loyalty to Charles I, having been twice High Sheriff of Yorkshire (1641 and 1662), and attended on the King when he was shut out of Hull. He raised a regiment of dragoons at his own expense, of which his younger brother, Doyley was colonel. After the Restoration he served in Parliament as Member for Malton from 1661 until his death in 1672.

Family
Gower had two wives, first, Elizabeth Howard, daughter of Sir William Howard of Naworth Castle, sister to Charles Earl of Carlisle, and second, Frances Leveson, daughter and coheir of Sir John Leveson, of Halling in Kent, and of Lilleshall in Shropshire, by Frances his wife, daughter and heiress of Sir Thomas Sondes, of Throwley in Kent, (elder brother of Sir Michael Sondes, who was grandfather to George Sondes, 1st Earl of Feversham) by Margaret, sister of Henry Brooke, 11th Baron Cobham. By which last Lady, this Sir Thomas Gower had two sons, Edward, and  Sir William Leveson-Gower, 4th Baronet, ancestor to George Granville Leveson-Gower, 2nd Marquess of Stafford; also a daughter Frances; but by his first wife he had no issue.

Notes

References
Collins, Arthur (1812). Collins's peerage of England: genealogical, biographical, and historical, Volume 2, Printed for F. C. and J. Rivington, Otridge and Son, J. Nichols and Co. T. Payne, Wilkie and Robinson, J. Walker, ... [and 21 others], 1812
Sanford, John Langton and Townsend, Meredith White (1865). The great governing families of England, Volume 1, W. Blackwood and sons, 1865

Attribution

Further reading
 Newman, P. R. (1993). The old service: Royalist regimental colonels and the Civil War, 1642-46, Manchester University Press ND,  p. 124: Suspicion as to his loyalty and capture in 1645.

1600s births
1672 deaths
Baronets in the Baronetage of England
Thomas Gower, 2nd Baronet
English MPs 1661–1679
High Sheriffs of Yorkshire
Cavaliers

Year of birth uncertain